Pochin Pits Colliery Platform railway station served Pochin Pits Colliery which was in Tredegar, in the historic county of Monmouthshire, Wales, from 1893 to 1960 on the Sirhowy Railway.

History
The station was opened in October 1893 by the London and North Western Railway. It was only open on Saturdays and services only ran to Newport initially but it later ran both ways. It closed to passengers in September 1922 but stayed open for miners until 13 June 1960.

References

Disused railway stations in Blaenau Gwent
Railway stations in Great Britain opened in 1893
Railway stations in Great Britain closed in 1922
1893 establishments in Wales
1960 disestablishments in Wales